Angel in Disguise may refer to:

"Angel in Disguise" (1940 song)
"Angel in Disguise" (Earl Thomas Conley song)
"Angel in Disguise" (McCartney-Starr song)
"Angel in Disguise" (Brandy Norwood song)
"Angel in Disguise" (Musiqq song)

See also 
 Angels in Disguise (disambiguation)
"(You're the) Devil in Disguise", a song by Elvis Presley